Sofota is a genus of beetles in the family Carabidae, containing the following species:

 Sofota chuji Jedlicka, 1951
 Sofota nigra Tian & Chen, 2000
 Sofota perakensis Kirschenhofer, 2010

References

Lebiinae